Sedric Andre Toney (born April 13, 1962) is an American former National Basketball Association (NBA) player. He was selected by the Atlanta Hawks with the 59th overall pick (third round) of the 1985 NBA draft.

Born in  Columbus, Mississippi, he played in five NBA seasons for six teams: Atlanta Hawks, Phoenix Suns, New York Knicks, Indiana Pacers, Sacramento Kings, and Cleveland Cavaliers.

Toney also played college basketball at Phillips BC and Western Nebraska Community College for one season each and the University of Dayton for two more seasons.

He currently works for ESPN as a color commentator for college basketball games.

External links
 Toney bio and statistics from basketball-reference.com

1962 births
Living people
American expatriate basketball people in the Philippines
American men's basketball players
Atlanta Hawks draft picks
Atlanta Hawks players
Basketball players from Mississippi
Basketball players from Dayton, Ohio
Charlotte Hornets expansion draft picks
Cincinnati Slammers players
Cleveland Cavaliers players
Columbus Horizon players
Dayton Flyers men's basketball players
Grand Rapids Hoops players
Indiana Pacers players
La Crosse Catbirds players
Magnolia Hotshots players
New York Knicks players
People from Columbus, Mississippi
Philippine Basketball Association imports
Phoenix Suns players
Point guards
Sacramento Kings players
Western Nebraska Cougars men's basketball players